Gertrude of Wyoming: A Pennsylvanian Tale (1809) is a romantic epic in Spenserian stanza composed by Scottish poet Thomas Campbell (1777–1844). The poem was well received, but not a financial success for its author. The poem was written in the context of the Battle of Wyoming. 

The poem begins:

On Susquehanna's side, fair Wyoming!
Although the wild-flower on thy ruin'd wall,
And roofless homes, a sad remembrance bring,
Of what thy gentle people did befall;
Yet thou wert once the loveliest land of all
That see the Atlantic wave their morn restore.
Sweet land! may I thy lost delights recall,
And paint thy Gertrude in her bowers of yore,
Whose beauty was the love of Pennsylvania's shore!

References

External links
Gertrude of Wyoming at Project Gutenberg
Gertrude of Wyoming; A Pennsylvanian Tale. And Other Poems. By Thomas Campbell. Author of "The Pleasures of Hope," &c. London: Printed by T. Bensley, Bolt Court. Published for the Author, by Longman, Hurst, Reed, and Orme, Paternoster Row. 1809.
Gertrude of Wyoming;, or The Pennsylvanian Cottage. By Thomas Campbell. With Thirty-Five Illustrations, Engraved by the Brothers Dalziel. New York: D. Appleton & Co 346 and 348, Broadway. 1858.

1809 poems
Scottish poetry
Wyoming Valley
Female characters in literature
Fictional characters from Wyoming
Literary characters introduced in 1809